Tsai Chia-hsin (born 25 July 1982) is a Taiwanese former badminton player. He competed at the 2006 and 2014 Asian Games. Tsai also competed (for the Republic of China as Chinese Taipei) in the 2004 Summer Olympics in mixed doubles with partner Cheng Wen-hsing and in 2016 Summer Olympics in men's doubles with partner Lee Sheng-mu. In 2004, they defeated Chris Dednam and Antoinette Uys of South Africa in the first round but lost to Zhang Jun and Gao Ling of China in the round of 16.

Achievements

Asian Championships 
Men's doubles

East Asian Games 
Men's doubles

Summer Universiade 
Men's doubles

Asian Junior Championships 
Mixed doubles

BWF Superseries 
The BWF Superseries, which was launched on 14 December 2006 and implemented in 2007, was a series of elite badminton tournaments, sanctioned by the Badminton World Federation (BWF). BWF Superseries levels were Superseries and Superseries Premier. A season of Superseries consisted of twelve tournaments around the world that had been introduced since 2011. Successful players were invited to the Superseries Finals, which were held at the end of each year.

Men's doubles

  BWF Superseries Finals tournament
  BWF Superseries Premier tournament
  BWF Superseries tournament

BWF Grand Prix 
The BWF Grand Prix had two levels, the Grand Prix and Grand Prix Gold. It was a series of badminton tournaments sanctioned by the Badminton World Federation (BWF) and played between 2007 and 2017.

Men's doubles

  BWF Grand Prix Gold tournament
  BWF Grand Prix tournament

BWF International Challenge/Series 
Men's doubles

  BWF International Challenge tournament
  BWF International Series tournament

References

External links 
 

1982 births
Living people
Sportspeople from Tainan
Taiwanese male badminton players
Badminton players at the 2004 Summer Olympics
Badminton players at the 2016 Summer Olympics
Olympic badminton players of Taiwan
Badminton players at the 2006 Asian Games
Badminton players at the 2014 Asian Games
Asian Games medalists in badminton
Asian Games bronze medalists for Chinese Taipei
Medalists at the 2014 Asian Games
Universiade silver medalists for Chinese Taipei
Universiade bronze medalists for Chinese Taipei
Universiade medalists in badminton
Medalists at the 2007 Summer Universiade